Rundi may refer to:

 Rundi language, the language of Burundi, commonly known as Kirundi
 Rundi people, the people of Burundi. For specific information see:
 Demographics of Burundi
 Culture of Burundi
 List of Burundians

Language and nationality disambiguation pages